Romanos Melikian (October 1, 1883, Kizlyar – March 30, 1935, Yerevan) was an Armenian composer.

He finished the Rostov Musical College, then the classes of Mikhail Ippolitov-Ivanov and B. Yavorsky. In 1914 he graduated from Saint Petersburg Conservatory. In 1908 he was among the organizers of "Music League" in Tiflis. In 1925 Melikian founded the musical school of Stepanakert, in 1933 he became one of the founders of Armenian Opera Theatre.

Romanos Melikian is buried at Komitas Pantheon which is located in the city center of Yerevan.

References

Sources
Biography (in Russian)

1883 births
1935 deaths
Armenian composers
People from Kizlyar
Russian people of Armenian descent
Burials at the Komitas Pantheon